"Municiones" is a song by Puerto Rican rapper Anuel AA and Puerto Rican singer Ozuna, released in January 2021. It was released as the third single from their collaborative album Los Dioses.

Charts

References

2021 songs
2021 singles
Anuel AA songs
Ozuna (singer) songs
Songs written by Anuel AA
Songs written by Ozuna (singer)
Spanish-language songs